Jesse Lewis may refer to:

Jesse Lewis, American businessman, co-founder of Lewis Drug
 Jesse Lewis IV, American model and actor on America's Most Smartest Model , Sistas (TV series),  Florida Man (TV series)
Jesse Lewis, journalist, Managing Editor of The Wall Street Journal Europe
Jesse Lewis (2006–2012), victim in the Sandy Hook Elementary School shooting
Jesse Lewis, Japanese idol, Member of boy band SixTONES

See also
Jesse Lewisohn (1872–1918), American financier
Jessie Penn-Lewis (1861–1927), Welsh evangelical speaker